In the Zone is the second studio album by Wayman Tisdale released in 1996 on Motown Records. The album reached No. 7 on the Billboard Contemporary Jazz Albums chart and No. 9 on the Billboard Jazz Albums chart.

Tracklisting

References

1996 albums
Jazz albums by American artists
Motown albums